Mary Shelley's Frankenstein is a 1994 science fiction horror film directed by Kenneth Branagh who also stars as Victor Frankenstein, with Robert De Niro portraying Frankenstein's monster (called The Creation in the film), and co-stars Tom Hulce, Helena Bonham Carter, Ian Holm, John Cleese, Richard Briers and Aidan Quinn. Considered the most faithful film adaptation of Mary Shelley's 1818 novel, Frankenstein; or, The Modern Prometheus, despite several differences and additions in plot from the novel, the film follows a medical student named Victor Frankenstein who creates new life in the form of a monster composed of various corpses' body parts.

Mary Shelley's Frankenstein premiered at the London Film Festival, and was released theatrically on November 4, 1994, by TriStar Pictures. The film received mixed reviews from critics, grossing $112 million worldwide on a budget of $45 million, deeming it less successful than the previous Francis Ford Coppola-produced horror adaptation, Bram Stoker's Dracula (1992).

Plot
In 1794, Captain Walton leads a troubled expedition to reach the North Pole. While their ship is trapped in the ice of the Arctic Sea, the crew hears a frightening noise and witnesses a mysterious figure killing their sled dogs before vanishing. The crew rescues a man, Victor Frankenstein, who had fallen in the Arctic waters. When Walton tells Victor of his determination to continue the expedition, Victor replies, "Do you share my madness?" He proceeds to tell Walton and the crew his life story, presented in flashback.

Victor grows up in Geneva with his adopted sister, Elizabeth Lavenza, the love of his life. Before he leaves for the University of Ingolstadt, Victor's mother dies giving birth to his brother William. Devastated by her loss, Victor vows on his mother's grave that he will find a way to conquer death. Victor and his friend Henry Clerval study under Shmael Augustus Waldman, a professor whose notes contain information on how to create life; Waldman warns Victor not to use them, lest he create an "abomination".

While performing vaccinations, Waldman is murdered by a patient, who is later hanged in the village square. Using the killer's body, a leg from a fellow student who died of cholera, and Waldman's brain, Victor builds a creature based on the professor's notes. He is so obsessed with his work that he drives Elizabeth away when she comes to take him away from Ingolstadt, which is being quarantined amid a cholera epidemic. Victor finally gives his creation life, but he is horrified by the creature's hideous appearance and tries to kill him. Frightened and confused, the creature steals Victor's coat and flees the laboratory, and is later driven away by the townspeople when he tries to steal food.

The creature finds shelter in a family's barn and stays there for months without their knowledge, gradually learning to read and speak by watching them. He attempts to earn their trust by anonymously bringing them food, and eventually converses with the elderly, blind patriarch after murdering an abusive debt collector. When the blind man's family returns, however, they are terrified of the creature and chase him away. The creature finds Victor's journal in his coat and learns of the circumstances of his creation. Upon returning to the farmhouse, he discovers the family has abandoned it, leaving him all alone once again. He burns down the farm and vows revenge on Victor for bringing him into a world that hates him.

Victor returns to Geneva to marry Elizabeth, only to find that his younger brother William has been murdered. The Frankensteins' servant Justine is blamed for the crime and hanged, but Victor knows the creature is responsible. The creature abducts Victor and demands that he make a female companion for him, promising to leave his creator in peace in return. Victor begins gathering the tools he used to create life, but when the creature insists that he use Justine's body to make the companion, a disgusted Victor breaks his promise. The creature exacts his revenge on Victor's wedding night by breaking into Elizabeth's bridal suite and ripping her heart out.

Desperate with grief, Victor races home to bring Elizabeth back to life. He stitches Elizabeth's head onto Justine's body and reanimates her as a disfigured, mindless shadow of her former self. The creature appears, demanding Elizabeth as his bride. Victor and the creature fight for Elizabeth's affections, but Elizabeth, horrified by her own reflection, commits suicide by setting herself on fire. Both Victor and the creature escape as the mansion burns down.

The story returns to the Arctic. Victor tells Walton that he has been pursuing his creation for months to kill him. Soon after relating his story, Victor dies of pneumonia. Walton discovers the creature weeping over Victor's body, having lost the only family he has ever known. The crew prepares a funeral pyre, but the ceremony is interrupted when the ice around the ship cracks. Walton invites the creature to stay with the ship, but the creature insists on remaining with the pyre. He takes the torch and burns himself alive with Victor's body. Walton, having seen the consequences of Victor's obsession, orders the ship to return home.

Cast

 Robert De Niro as The Creation, a reanimated corpse who is rejected by all of humanity and swears revenge on the entire world as a result.
 De Niro also portrays Professor Waldman's killer, whose body was used for the creature.
 Kenneth Branagh as Victor Frankenstein, a scientist obsessed with conquering death, an obsession that ultimately destroys his life.
 Rory Jennings as young Victor Frankenstein.
 Tom Hulce as Henry Clerval, Frankenstein's best friend and fellow medical student, and later, his trusted partner when he inherits his father's practice.
 Helena Bonham Carter as Elizabeth Lavenza Frankenstein, Frankenstein's fiancée and adoptive sister. She is murdered by the Creation, but Frankenstein brings her back to life before she commits suicide, horrified by her own appearance.
 Hannah Taylor Gordon as young Elizabeth Lavenza.
 Ian Holm as Baron Alphonse Frankenstein, Victor Frankenstein's elderly father, and one of the Creation's victims.
 John Cleese as Professor Waldman, Frankenstein's tutor and colleague who shares his interest in creating life but fears the consequences of doing so. His brain is later used for the creature following his death at the hands of a patient.
 Aidan Quinn as Captain Robert Walton, the commander of the ship which picks up Frankenstein in the Arctic Circle.
 Richard Briers as Grandfather, an elderly blind man who is kind to the Creation.
 Robert Hardy as Professor Krempe, a university tutor of medical sciences who condemns Frankenstein's theories of life beyond death.
 Trevyn McDowell as Justine Moritz, Mrs. Moritz's daughter, a nursemaid in the Frankenstein household who is close friends with Elizabeth and harbors an unrequited love for Victor. She is executed for murdering William, a crime actually committed by the Creation.
 Christina Cuttall as young Justine Moritz.
 Celia Imrie as Mrs. Moritz, the head of the household staff at Frankenstein Manor who often fights with her daughter, Justine.
 Cherie Lunghi as Caroline Frankenstein, Victor's mother who dies during the birth of his younger brother, William.
 Ryan Smith as William Frankenstein, Victor's younger brother.
 Charles Wyn-Davies as young William Frankenstein.
 Hugh Bonneville as Schiller.
 Jenny Galloway as Vendor's wife.
 Alex Lowe as Crewman.
 George Asprey as Policeman.
 Patrick Doyle (uncredited) as Ballroom orchestra conductor.
 Stuart Hazeldine (uncredited) as Man in crowd scene.
 Fay Ripley (deleted scenes) as Whore.

Release
The film had its world premiere on November 3, 1994 at the London Film Festival before opening in the United Kingdom and United States on November 4.

Reception

Frank Darabont
Original screenwriter Steph Lady, who sold the script to Francis Ford Coppola's American Zoetrope, said "the film was a shocking disappointment; a misshapen monster born of Kenneth Branagh's runaway ego. He took a poignant, thought-provoking tragedy and turned it into a heavy metal monster movie. The casting of Robert De Niro as the monster was beyond inexplicable." Frank Darabont, who did a second draft, later called the film "the best script I ever wrote and the worst movie I've ever seen". He elaborated:
There's a weird doppelgänger effect when I watch the movie. It's kind of like the movie I wrote, but not at all like the movie I wrote. It has no patience for subtlety. It has no patience for quiet moments. It has no patience period. It's big and loud and blunt and rephrased by the director at every possible turn. Cumulatively, the effect was a totally different movie. I don't know why Branagh needed to make this big, loud film ... the material was subtle. Shelley's book was way out there in a lot of ways, but it's also very subtle. I don't know why it had to be this operatic attempt at filmmaking. Shelley's book is not operatic, it whispers at you a lot. The movie was a bad one. That was my Waterloo. That's where I really got my ass kicked most as a screenwriter ... [Branagh] really took the brunt of the blame for that film, which was appropriate. That movie was his vision entirely. If you love that movie you can throw all your roses at Ken Branagh's feet. If you hated it, throw your spears there too, because that was his movie.

Critical response
On Rotten Tomatoes the film had an approval rating of 42% based on 53 reviews. The site's consensus was: "Mary Shelley's Frankenstein is ambitious and visually striking, but the overwrought tone and lack of scares make for a tonally inconsistent experience".

Roger Ebert gave the film two and a half stars out of four, writing: "I admired the scenes with De Niro [as the Creature] so much I'm tempted to give Mary Shelley's Frankenstein a favorable verdict. But it's a near miss. The Creature is on target, but the rest of the film is so frantic, so manic, it doesn't pause to be sure its effects are registered". Janet Maslin wrote: "Branagh is in over his head. He displays neither the technical finesse to handle a big, visually ambitious film nor the insight to develop a stirring new version of this story. Instead, this is a bland, no-fault Frankenstein for the '90s, short on villainy but loaded with the tragically misunderstood. Even the Creature (Robert De Niro), an aesthetically challenged loner with a father who rejected him, would make a dandy guest on any daytime television talk show".

Conversely, James Berardinelli of Reelviews.net gave the film three out of four stars: "Mary Shelley's Frankenstein may not be the definitive version of the 1818 novel, and the director likely attempted more than is practical for a two-hour film, but overambition is preferable to the alternative, especially if it results—as in this case—in something more substantial than Hollywood's typical, fitfully entertaining fluff".

Audiences polled by CinemaScore gave the film an average grade of "B−" on an A+ to F scale.

Box office
In the U.S. and Canada, the film grossed $22,006,296, with the opening weekend of $11,212,889 making up more than half of its total. The film opened the same day in the United Kingdom and Ireland and grossed £2 million in its opening week from 320 screens. Outside the U.S., it grossed $90 million, bringing the worldwide gross to $112 million.

Year-end lists 
 3rd worst – Peter Travers, Rolling Stone
 9th worst – Janet Maslin, The New York Times

Accolades

Video game

A video game adaptation based on the film was released on numerous home video game consoles in 1994. A themed pinball machine was released in 1995 by Sega Pinball; it is one of the machines included in the video pinball simulator The Pinball Arcade.

See also
 Frankenstein in popular culture
 List of films featuring Frankenstein's monster
 Bram Stoker's Dracula (1992), a similar adaptation from Coppola

References

External links

 
 
 
 

Frankenstein films
1994 films
1994 horror films
1990s science fiction horror films
American science fiction horror films
American Zoetrope films
Films directed by Kenneth Branagh
Films produced by Francis Ford Coppola
Films with screenplays by Frank Darabont
Films based on horror novels
Films scored by Patrick Doyle
Films set in country houses
Films set in Germany
Films set in Switzerland
Films set in 1794
Films set in the Arctic
Films shot in England
Films shot at Pinewood Studios
Films adapted into comics
Films shot in Switzerland
Grave-robbing in film
Gothic horror films
TriStar Pictures films
Period horror films
1990s English-language films
1990s American films